The 1970 Bulgarian Cup Final was the 30th final of the Bulgarian Cup (in this period the tournament was named Cup of the Soviet Army), and was contested between Levski Sofia and CSKA Sofia on 25 August 1970 at Vasil Levski National Stadium in Sofia. Levski won the final 2–1.

Match

Details

See also
1969–70 A Group

References

Bulgarian Cup finals
PFC CSKA Sofia matches
PFC Levski Sofia matches
Cup Final